The 33rd Producers Guild of America Awards (also known as 2022 Producers Guild Awards or 2022 PGA Awards), honoring the best film and television producers of 2021, were held at the Fairmont Century Plaza in Los Angeles, California on March 19, 2022. Originally scheduled to take place on February 26, 2022, the ceremony was postponed amid a surge in COVID-19 infections due to the Omicron variant. The nominations in the documentary category were announced on December 10, 2021, the nominees in the sports, children's and short-form categories were announced on January 18, 2022, and the remaining nominations for film and television were announced on January 27, 2022. The nominations for the PGA Innovation Award were announced on February 24, 2022.

Winners and nominees

Film

Television

PGA Innovation Award

Milestone Award
 George Lucas and Kathleen Kennedy

Stanley Kramer Award
 Rita Moreno

Visionary Award
 Issa Rae

David O. Selznick Achievement Award in Theatrical Motion Pictures
 Mary Parent

Norman Lear Achievement Award in Television
 Greg Berlanti

References

External links
 PGA Awards website

 2021
Producers Guild of America Awards
Producers Guild of America Awards
Producers Guild of America Awards
Events postponed due to the COVID-19 pandemic